Liberty Township is a township in Elk County, Kansas, USA.  As of the 2000 census, its population was 117.

Geography
According to the USGS, it contains three cemeteries: Mount Zion, Old Tailor and Wade.

The stream of Little Indian Creek runs through this township.

Transportation
Liberty Township contains one airport or landing strip, Clogston Ranch Landing Strip.

References
 USGS Geographic Names Information System (GNIS)

External links
 US-Counties.com
 City-Data.com

Townships in Elk County, Kansas
Townships in Kansas